The 1929 season was Wisła Krakóws 21st year as a club.

Friendlies

Ekstraklasa

Squad, appearances and goals

|}

Goalscorers

External links
1929 Wisła Kraków season at historiawisly.pl

Wisła Kraków seasons
Association football clubs 1929 season
Wisla